Abin may refer to:
 Abin Sur, a fictional character
 Rabbi Abin I, Jewish Talmudist
 Jose ben Abin, Jewish Talmudist
 Idi b. Abin Abin Naggara, Jewish Talmudist
 Hiyya b. Abin Naggara, Jewish Talmudist
 Aba (people), an ethnic group in Siberia

See also
 ABIN- the intelligence agency of Brazil